The 1986–87 Copa del Rey was the 85th staging of the Copa del Rey. The winners, Real Sociedad, qualified for the 1987–88 European Cup Winners' Cup. The competition began on 17 September 1986 and concluded on 27 June 1987 with the final.

First round
17 September 1986

Bye: San Sebastián CF, Valladolid Promesas, Atlético Astorga CF, Mallorca Atlético, CD Roquetas, UE Lleida, CD Olímpic de Xàtiva, Cartagena FC, CD Rayo Cantabria

Second round
1 October 1986

Bye: Bilbao Athletic, Atlético Baleares, Atlético Marbella, UD Montijo, Real Balompédica Linense, Deportivo de La Coruña, UP Langreo.

Third round

Fourth round

Bracket

Round of 16 

|}

First leg

Second leg

Quarter-finals 

|}

First leg

Second leg

Semi-finals 

|}

First leg

Second leg

Final

References

External links 

  RSSSF
  Linguasport
  Youtube: Final '87 - Atlético de Madrid vs Real Sociedad (Penalty shoot-out)

Copa del Rey seasons
Copa